The Essential Pebbles Collection is a series of compilation albums of obscure garage rock and psychedelic rock recordings that were originally released in the mid-1960s.  As the name implies, the series was created by AIP Records as a distillation of the albums in the Pebbles series and the Highs in the Mid-Sixties series that had been released in earlier years.  Only two more albums in the Pebbles series have been issued since the Essential Pebbles series was begun.

Nature of the music

The first volume selects tracks from the first 10 CDs in the Pebbles series plus Ear-Piercing Punk, while the second volume collects recordings previously included on the LPs in the Pebbles series and Highs in the Mid-Sixties series that had not yet been reissued on CD.  In the first two volumes, a second CD of "insanely rare bonus tracks" is provided in each volume.  No information is provided about any of these recordings except that all but 2 are said to be previously un-reissued in any form.  The third volume (both CDs) features recordings from continental European bands that had previously been featured in the Continent Lashes Back sub-series within the Pebbles series.

Each of the volumes in the Essential Pebbles series have as many tracks as many box sets:  55 in the first two volumes, and 48 in the third volume.

Discography

 Essential Pebbles, Volume 1; released as #AIP CD 1958 in 1997
 Essential Pebbles, Volume 2; released as #AIP CD 1960 in 1998
 Essential Pebbles, Volume 3; released as #AIP 1964 in 2000

See also
 Pebbles series

External links
AIP Records — Mail Order Site
AIP Records — Historical Information

Web Radio
https://web.archive.org/web/20070312010015/http://www.radio60.dyndns.org/